FC Yerevan was an Armenian professional football club from the capital Yerevan.

History
FC Yerevan played in the Armenian Premier League and won the 1997 title. It was founded in 1995 and lasted for five years. It played its home matches at the Hrazdan Stadium. After the 1999 season, the club was dissolved and the players moved on to other clubs in Yerevan.

On July 13, 2018, Football Federation of Armenia announced that the FC Yerevan is returning to professional football and will be taking part in the 2018-19 Armenian First League.

On 5 September, Nebojša Petrović was relieved of his duties as Yerevan's manager, with Assistant Coach Georgi Ghazaryan being placed in temporary charge for Yerevans games against Lori on 13 September. On 16 September, Vlad Goian was appointed as Manager on a one-year contract, before being relieved of his duties and replaced by António Caldas on 4 October. Caldas then resigned on 11 November 2019 following a 7-2 defeat to Ararat-Armenia.

On 21 February 2020, the Football Federation of Armenia announced that FC Yerevan had withdrawn from the 2019–20 Armenian Premier League due to financial and technical problems.

League and cup

European record

As of August 15, 2018

 Home results are noted in bold

Current squad

Honours
 Armenian Premier League (1): 1997

Club records

Personnel
 Owner/President: Karen Harutyunyan
 Chief Executive Officer: Arman Harutyunyan
 Press Secretary: Norayr Harutyunyan
 Sporting director: Samvel Sargsyan
 Head coach: Nebojša Petrović
 Assistant coach: Georgi Ghazaryan
 Goalkeepers Coach: Martik Mkrtumyan

Managers
  Gagik Tatevosyan, 1995
  Vagarshak Aslanyan, 1995
  Samvel Darbinyan, 1995–1996
  Samvel Petrosyan, 1996–1997
  Samvel Darbinyan, 1997
  Ashot Khachatryan, 1997–1998
  Samvel Darbinyan, 1998–1999
  Aramais Tonoyan, 1999
  Samvel Sargsyan, 2018–2019
  Eduard Pavlov, 2019

References

 
Association football clubs established in 1995
Yerevan
Yerevan
1995 establishments in Armenia
2019 disestablishments in Armenia
Association football clubs disestablished in 2019